100 Day Renovation is a 2019 New Zealand home renovation reality TV show broadcast on Prime Television. The series follows television couple Alex Breingan and Rachel Hart as they renovate their house in 100 days. The series is hosted by Hamish Dodd.

The show is part of the 100 Day Home series. It is the follow up to 100 Day Bach, which was released in 2015.

References

Television series by Blue Ant Studios
New Zealand reality television series